Leonardo Mayer was the two-time defending champion, but he did not participate that year.
Pablo Cuevas won the title, after Paolo Lorenzi withdrew from the final.

Seeds

Draw

Finals

Top half

Bottom half

References
 Main Draw
 Qualifying Draw

Challenger Ciudad de Guayaquil